Daniel Michael King (born 5 March 1969) is a British writer.

Early life 
Danny King was born in Slough, Buckinghamshire (now Berkshire), the second son of Michael and Dorothy King. He and his two brothers, Ralph and Robin, lived on the Britwell Estate until 1979, when they moved to Yateley, Hampshire. He attended Yateley School but failed to gain any qualifications before leaving at the age of 16. He stacked shelves for a short stint in the Yateley branch of Somerfield (then Gateway), before working on various building sites as a hod carrier.

In 1991 he took an Access course at Farnborough College of Technology, which helped him land a place at The London College of Printing studying journalism. Between 1993 and 2002 he worked on various magazine titles, eventually becoming Editor of the Paul Raymond Publications title Mayfair (magazine). He now writes full-time.

Books 
The Burglar Diaries – published by Serpent's Tail (2001)
The Bank Robber Diaries – published by Serpent's Tail (2002)
The Hitman Diaries – published by Serpent's Tail (2003)
Mordsjob (german translation) – published by Luzifer-Verlag (2018)
The Pornographer Diaries – published by Serpent's Tail (2004)
Milo's Marauders – published by Serpent's Tail (2005)
Milo's Run – published by Serpent's Tail (2006)
School for Scumbags – published by Serpent's Tail (2007)
Blue Collar – published by Serpent's Tail (2009)
More Burglar Diaries – published by Byker Books (2009)
The Henchmen's Book Club – self-published on Kindle and as paperback (2011)
The Monster Man of Horror House – self-published on Kindle (2011)
The Monster Man of Horror House – self-published as paperback (2014)
Das Haus der Monster (german translation) – published by Luzifer-Verlag (2017)
Infidelity for Beginners – published by Byker Books (2012)
The No.1 Zombie Detective Agency – self-published on Kindle (2012)
The No.1 Zombie Detective Agency – self-published as paperback (2020)
Eat Locals – published by Wild Wolf Publishing (2017)
Eat Local(s) - Rate, wer zum Essen kommt (german translation) – published by Luzifer-Verlag (2018)
Amy X rennt allen davon (german translation) – published by Piper-Verlag (2019)
Amy X and The Great Race – self-published on Kindle and as paperback (2021)
Amy X und die Schule für perfekte Prinzessinnen (german translation) – published by Piper-Verlag (2020)
Amy X and The Prim & Proper Princess School – self-published on Kindle and as paperback (2021)
The Monster Man of Horror House Returns – self-published on Kindle and as paperback (2020)
Das Haus der Monster – Die Monster sind zurück (german translation) – published by Luzifer-Verlag (2020)
Curse of the Monster Man of Horror House – self-published on Kindle and as paperback (2020)
Amy X and The Terrible Typhoon – self-published on Kindle and as paperback (2021)
The Ugly Sisters – self-published on Kindle and as paperback (2021)

Film and television 
 2007 Thieves Like Us, six part sitcom adapted from his first book, The Burglar Diaries, with the BBC
 2010 The Hitman Diaries, short film adapted from his book of the same name, directed by Mark Abraham
 2011 Wild Bill, feature film co-written with Dexter Fletcher
 2017 Eat Locals, feature film directed by Jason Flemyng
 2017 Run Run As Fast As You Can, short film directed by Katie Smith
 2018 Seven Sharp, short film directed by Roque Cameselle
 2018 Little Monsters, short film directed by Simon Harris
 2018 Romantic, short film adapted from The Hitman Diaries, directed by Constantine Tupitsyn (Russia)

Stage 
 The Pornographer Diaries, adapted from his book of the same name. It was produced by Have a Word Productions (Kate McCarthy) and played at the C venues during the 2007 Edinburgh Festival from 1 to 27 August, starring Gary Beadle, Jessica Harris (actress) and David Swire.
 The Hitman Diaries, translated (Killlera Dienasgrāmata) and adapted for the stage by J. J. Jillinger and performed by the Liepāja Teatris (Theatre) Company in Latvia from 2007 to 2011. Literary Director Edite Tisheizere.

Awards
 2002 Amazon.co.uk Bursary Award – Best First Novel – The Burglar Diaries
 2012 Writers' Guild of Great Britain Award – Best First Feature Film – Wild Bill
 2016 Wells Festival of Literature – Children's Story Competition – Amy X and the Great Race

Nominations
 2010 Melissa Nathan Award for Comedy Romance – Best comedy romance novel – Blue Collar
 2013 BAFTA Film Awards – Outstanding Debut by a British Writer, Director or Producer – Wild Bill
 2017 Wells Festival of Literature – Children's Story Competition – Amy X and the Prim & Proper Princess School
 2017 Vincent Preis Horror Awards (Germany) – International Work – Das Haus Der Monster

Personal life 
He married Jeannette Crockett in March 2007 and they live in Chichester, West Sussex with their four children.

References

External links 
 IMDb
 Serpent's Tail
 Danny King 

British male screenwriters
British dramatists and playwrights
1969 births
Living people
British male dramatists and playwrights